Jan Gordon (born Godfrey Jervis Gordon in Berkshire, England, 1882–1944) was an English printmaker, painter/draughtsman, and journalist/critic; and his wife, Cora Gordon  (born Cora Josephine Turner in Buxton, England, also known as Jo Gordon, 1879–1950) was an English artist, writer, and musician. They were prominent artists who were active in the first half of the 20th century.

Biography 
Their first book, The Luck of Thirteen (1916), documented life in the Serbian mission of the Royal Free Hospital and an audacious escape during the 1915 retreat from Serbia. James Berry, leader of this mission, in his 1916 book described the Gordons and their various exploits during their time in Serbia.

According to Berry,

Following the Serbia experience, Jan Gordon was active in the design of dazzle camouflage for WWI ships. He later held an exhibition of watercolours on the subject. After the war, a painting journey to Spain resulted in the 1922 book, Poor Folk in Spain, which was the beginning of a long and popular series of Two Vagabonds travel books.Jan and Cora Gordon were signatories to the 1927 letter protesting the piracy of James Joyce's Ulysses in the USA.

Jan and Cora Gordon had a wide network of artistic acquaintances in Paris between the wars. One of these, Myron Nutting (a friend of James Joyce), wrote affectionately about the Gordons, whom he last saw later in 1927 as they were planning their USA journey. Screenwriter Charles Bennett had also reminisced about the Gordons in Paris at around this time, mentioning some of the cast of characters in their circle of friends: "Through Jan and Cora Gordon I saw the Latin Quarter as it really was. I dined at tiny, superb, but cheap restaurants; the Rotonde and the Dome became my local pubs. I met Picasso and Utrillo and Diego Rivera, and dozens of others."

Between them, the couple wrote 27 books, including five novels and five books on art, together with numerous magazine articles.

Published works 

Also published as 

Also published as 

; 
Also published as 

Also published as 

Also published as

References

Further reading

External links 
 

Forgotten Travellers: Vagabonds Abroad  Essay on Jan and Cora Gordon

20th-century English writers
20th-century English artists
20th-century English musicians
Married couples
Art duos